The Dupang Mountains are series of mountains located between the middle western Guilin of Guangxi and the southwestern Yongzhou of Hunan Provinces, one of the Five Large Ranges in the Nanling Ranges.

Dupangling National Nature Reserve
The Dupangling National Nature Reserve is a protected area at national level in China. It is located in the southwest of Yongzhou, along the main range of the Dupang Mountains. The protected area is bordered to the east by Qingtang Town (清塘镇) of Dao County and Qianjiadong Township (千家峒乡) of Jiangyong County, to the south by Yunshan Town (允山镇) of Jiangyong, to the west by Guanyang County of Guangxi, to the north by Shouyan Town (寿雁镇) and Xianzijiao Town (仙子脚镇) of Dao County. The protected area mainly protects the most typical and representative vegetation and forest ecosystems in the subtropical transitional zone, it is a forest ecosystem of protected area approved to establish in April 2004 by the State Council.

References

Ranges of the Nanling Mountains
Mountains of Yongzhou
Geography of Guilin